Palmapampa Airport  is an airport serving the town of Palmapampa in the Ayacucho Region of Peru. The runway is just off the AY-101 Santa Rosa - Samugari Road.

See also

Transport in Peru
List of airports in Peru

References

External links
OpenStreetMap - Palmapampa

Airports in Peru
Buildings and structures in Ayacucho Region